El Guerdane is a town in Taroudant Province, Souss-Massa, Morocco. According to the 2004 census it has a population of 9,222.

References

Populated places in Taroudannt Province
Municipalities of Morocco